HopCat is a restaurant and bar chain based in Grand Rapids, Michigan, United States, with seventeen locations in eight states. HopCat is best known for having a wide array of beers on tap, with several of their locations offering over 100 different options.

Founded in 2008 in Grand Rapids by Mark Sellers, the original HopCat in Grand Rapids is a brewpub with its own small brewery, which typically supplies 4-6 house-made beers alongside craft beers from around the country. HopCat opened its second location in East Lansing, Michigan in 2013. 

In 2015, BarFly Ventures secured $25 million in capital financing to support its effort to expand HopCat, which will open as many as 30 locations over the next several years.

On June 6, 2020, BarFly Ventures filed for Chapter 11 bankruptcy protection in Grand Rapids, MI.

Accolades

The Grand Rapids location was recognized as one of the best brewpubs in the United States by RateBeer.com from 2013 to 2015. In 2010, HopCat was rated No. 3 on BeerAdvocate's list of "Best Beer Bars on Planet Earth."

Controversy
On December 15, 2018, Barfly Ventures CEO Mark Gray announced that Hopcat would be renaming its famous “Crack Fries” in order to avoid making light of the drug the name refers to as well as addiction to said drug.
The fries were renamed "Cosmik Fries" in reference to Frank Zappa's song "Cosmik Debris".

Locations

Ann Arbor, Michigan - Downtown
Detroit, Michigan - Midtown
East Lansing, Michigan
Grand Rapids, Michigan (original location, opened in 2008) - Heartside
Grand Rapids, Michigan - Knapp's Corner
Holland, Michigan
Indianapolis, Indiana - Broad Ripple
Kalamazoo, Michigan - Downtown
Kansas City, Missouri - Westport - CLOSED
Lexington, Kentucky - CLOSED
Louisville, Kentucky - Bardstown Road - CLOSED
Lincoln, Nebraska - West Haymarket
Madison, Wisconsin - Capitol - CLOSED
Minneapolis, Minnesota - Downtown - CLOSED
Port St. Lucie, Florida - Tradition - CLOSED
Royal Oak, Michigan
St. Louis, Missouri - Delmar Loop - CLOSED

References

External links

BarFly Ventures

Gastropubs in the United States
Restaurant chains in the United States
Companies based in Grand Rapids, Michigan
Restaurants established in 2008
2008 establishments in Michigan
Companies that filed for Chapter 11 bankruptcy in 2020